The 2017 Southern Conference softball tournament was held at Jim Frost Stadium on the campus of the University of Tennessee at Chattanooga in Chattanooga, Tennessee, from May 10 through May 13, 2017.  won their first-ever tournament championship and earned the SoCon's automatic bid to the 2017 NCAA Division I softball tournament. The Championship game was broadcast on ESPN3 while all other games were broadcast on the SoCon Digital Network.

Format
The SoCon Tournament takes the top 7 teams and places them in a double elimination tournament, up until the championship. Seed 1 gets a bye to the 2nd Round. The championship game is played with a winner-take-all single game format.

Bracket

References

Southern Conference Tournament
Southern Conference softball tournament
Southern Conference Tournament